D'Abruzzo is an Italian surname meaning "of Abruzzo". Notable people with this surname include the following:

Alan Alda (born 1936), a.k.a. Alphonso Joseph D'Abruzzo
Robert Alda (1914-1986), a.k.a. Alphonso Giuseppe Giovanni Roberto D'Abruzzo
Stephanie D'Abruzzo (born 1971), actress and puppeteer

Italian-language surnames
Italian toponymic surnames
Ethnonymic surnames